Flax newirlandi is a moth of the family Erebidae first described by Michael Fibiger in 2011. It is found in Papua New Guinea (it was described from the Bismarck Islands, near the centre of New Ireland).

The wingspan is about 9 mm. The forewings (including fringes) are light brown, with brown subterminal and terminal areas. The base of the costa and the quadrangular patch in the upper medial area are dark brown, with a black dot in inner lower area. The crosslines are indistinct and brown. The terminal line is only indicated by dark-brown interveinal dots. The hindwings are light grey. The underside of the forewings is unicolorous brown and the  underside of the hindwings is grey with a discal spot.

The only known specimen was collected in a clearing near the village of Lemkamin, which is surrounded by primary forest.

References

Micronoctuini
Moths described in 2011
Taxa named by Michael Fibiger